Aranka Kops (born 8 October 1995) is a Dutch rowing cox.

She steered the Dutch men's eight to their silver medal at the 2019 World Rowing Championships.

References

External links

1995 births
Living people
Dutch female rowers
World Rowing Championships medalists for the Netherlands